"If Headz Only Knew" is the second single released from Heather B.'s debut album, Takin' Mine. It was released on April 16, 1996 and produced by Kenny Parker. The single was a moderate success, peaking at 20 on the Hot Rap Singles chart, becoming her second straight top-20 single on that chart.

Single track listing

A-Side
"If Headz Only Knew" (Radio Version)- 4:39  
"If Headz Only Knew" (Main Version)- 4:42

B-Side
"If Headz Only Knew" (Instrumental with Chorus Version)- 4:42  
"No Doubt" (Radio Version)- 4:00  
"No Doubt" (Main Version)- 4:06

Charts

1996 singles
1996 songs
EMI Records singles